Sharni Vinson (born 22 July 1983) is an Australian actress and dancer. She is known for her roles in the television soap opera Home and Away, and in the films Bait 3D, Step Up 3D and You're Next.

Early life 
Born in Sydney, Vinson grew up in the southern beach suburb of Cronulla. As a teenager, she trained and competed at a national level in swimming, holding four state records throughout high school. She began singing, dancing and acting at a young age, becoming the third generation in her family of performers; in 1945, her grandmother was the youngest ballerina to be offered a scholarship in the Brovansky Ballet Company in England. At age twelve, Vinson enrolled at the Brent Street School of Performing Arts in Sydney.

Career 
Vinson entered the entertainment industry as a musician. At 17, she and three other young women formed the pop/R&B group Foxfire IV. Their sole single, "Roses", peaked at number 47 on the ARIA charts. They disbanded shortly thereafter.

Vinson made her acting debut portraying minor characters in two episodes of the Australian soap opera Home and Away in 2001 and 2003. She left an impression on the show's casting agent, who recommended her for a regular role on the series. She initially auditioned for the role of Martha MacKenzie, but was cast as Cassie Turner, a troubled teenager who is taken into foster care after numerous run-ins with the police. She quickly proved popular with the show's audience and was nominated for "Most Popular New Female Talent" at the Logie Awards of 2006.

In July 2007, speculation arose that Vinson intended to leave the series to pursue an acting career in Los Angeles and that November she confirmed that she would indeed be leaving the series. Her final appearance was on 2 April 2008.

The following year, Vinson made her American television debut on the TBS sitcom My Boys. She has since appeared on a number of other American network television series such as NCIS and CSI: NY alongside former boyfriend A.J. Buckley. She also made a guest appearance on the final season of the CBS Crime television series Cold Case, which aired in 2010, and in the music video for Matchbox Twenty's "Put Your Hands Up".

In March 2009, Vinson was cast as Natalie, the female lead in Step Up 3D, the third installment of the Step Up film series. It was her highest-profile role since relocating to America. Filming took place in New York City. Despite mixed reviews, the film was the trilogy's most successful installment, grossing over $159 million worldwide.

Vinson's follow-up role was in Universal Pictures Straight-to-DVD film Blue Crush 2, a sequel to the 2002 Drama/Romance film Blue Crush which starred Kate Bosworth and Michelle Rodriguez. Vinson portrayed the role of the film's villain Tara, an internationally successful pro-surfer. The film was released in June 2011. In October 2010 Vinson returned to Australia to begin production on Vinson's first role in an Australian film in the Paramount Pictures horror film Bait 3D as Tina, the protagonist's ex-girlfriend. The film follows a group of people trapped inside a flooded supermarket, following a freak tsunami, with a 12-foot great white shark. Vinson was reunited with former Home and Away cast member Lincoln Lewis. The film was shot in Brisbane on a $20 million budget. The film which was released in September 2012, was released to mixed reviews and failed to make an impact on the domestic box office. However, it was successful in China, Italy and Thailand, and earned $29 million worldwide. 

Following Bait 3D, Vinson was cast in another horror film project that became her most critically acclaimed role to date. You're Next centers on a family reunion that goes terribly wrong when a group of mysterious masked killers start killing them off one by one. Vinson played the film's protagonist, Erin, the girlfriend of one of the family's sons. She was able to portray Erin with her natural Australian accent. Initially an independent film, its premiere at the 2011 Toronto International Film Festival secured it a distribution deal with Lionsgate. It was released in North America almost two years later, in August 2013. It received mostly positive reviews, with special regards for Vinson's performance; Total Film rated her character #1 on its list of '50 Most Bad-Ass Female Horror Leads'.

In March 2014 Vinson appeared in the Australian independent horror film Patrick, a remake of the 1978 film of the same name. Vinson portrayed nurse Kathy Jacquar, whose comatose patient Patrick uses his psychic powers to stalk her. It premiered in July 2013 at the Melbourne International Film Festival and received a limited Australian theatrical release in March 2014. It is Vinson's most critically acclaimed film to date, receiving 83% on Rotten Tomatoes based on 18 reviews. In 2015, Vinson appears alongside John Cusack and Jackie Chan in Dragon Blade.

Personal life
As of January 2019, Vinson holds dual citizenship for Australia and the United States.

Filmography

Film

Television

References

External links

1983 births
Australian film actresses
Australian soap opera actresses
American film actresses
American soap opera actresses
Living people
Actresses from Sydney
Singers from Sydney
21st-century Australian actresses
21st-century American actresses
Australian female dancers
Australian women singers
American female dancers
21st-century Australian singers
21st-century American women singers
21st-century American singers
American people of Australian descent
Australian Survivor contestants